Zamina Begum (11 January 1917 – 28 April 1978), also known as Zainab Begum, was an Afghan princess. She was the First Lady of Afghanistan in 1973–1978, as the wife of the first President of Afghanistan, Sardar Mohammed Daoud Khan.

Life
She was the daughter of King Mohammed Nadir Shah and Mah Parwar Begum, and the sister of King Zahir. Her brother succeeded her father in November 1933. She married Daoud in September 1934. 

Zamina Begum famously played a role in the women's emancipation policy of her husband's government, notably by appearing unveiled in public. The Prime Minister prepared women's emancipation carefully and gradually. He began by introducing women workers at the Radio Kabul in 1957, by sending women delegates to the Asian Women's Conference in Kairo, and by employing forty girls to the government pottery factory in 1958.  When this was met with no riots, the government decided it was time for the very controversial step of unveiling.  

In August 1959, on the second day of the festival of Jeshyn, Princess Zamina appeared unveiled alongside Queen Humaira and Princess Bilqis in the Royal Box at the military parade.  A group of Islamic clerics sent a letter of protest to the Prime Minister to protest and demand that the words of sharia be respected.  The Prime Minister answered by inviting them to the capital and present proof to him that the holy scripture indeed demanded the chadri.  When the clerics could not find such a passage, the Prime Minister declared that the female members of the Royal Family would no longer wear veils, because the Islamic law did not demand it.  While the chadri was never banned, the example of the Queen and the Prime Minister's wife was followed by the wives and daughters of government officials as well as by other urban women of the upperclass and middle class, with Kubra Noorzai and Masuma Esmati-Wardak, who is known as the first commoner pioneers. 

She was killed during the Saur Revolution on 28 April 1978 at the Arg. 

She was reburied in the Deh Sabz District in Kabul along with her husband and other family members in 2009.

Family 
The couple had four sons and four daughters:
1. Zarlasht Daoud Khan 
2. Khalid Daoud Khan (1947–1978). Had a son:
Tariq Daoud Khan
3. Wais Daoud Khan (1947–1978). Had four children:
 Turan Daoud Khan (1972-)
 Ares Daoud Khan (1973 – k. 1978)
 Waygal Daoud Khan (1975 – k. 1978)
 Zahra Khanum (1970-)
4. Muhammad Umar Daoud Khan (k. 1978). Had two daughters:
 Hila Khanum (1961 – k. 1978)
 Ghazala Khanum (1964 – k. 1978)
5. Dorkhanai Begum
6. Zarlasht Begum (k. 1978)
7. Shinkay Begum (k. 1978). Had two daughters:
 Ariane Heila Khanum Ghazi (1961-)
 Hawa Khanum Ghazi (1963-)
8. Torpekay Begum. Had three children:
 Shah Mahmud Khan Ghazi 
 Daud Khan Ghazi 
 Zahra Khanum Ghazi

Ancestry

References

1917 births
1978 deaths
First ladies of Afghanistan
People from Kabul
Afghan princesses